The Mark of Cain is a 1947 British drama film directed by Brian Desmond Hurst and starring Eric Portman, Sally Gray, Patrick Holt and Dermot Walsh. The film is based on the 1943 novel Airing in a Closed Carriage by Marjorie Bowen, which in turn was based on the true life murder trial of Florence Maybrick. It was made at Denham Studios with sets designed by the art director Alex Vetchinsky.

Plot
English industrialist Richard Howard visits Bordeaux, France to buy cotton for his mills from Sarah Bonheur, He becomes enamoured by Sarah and spends much of his business trip sight-seeing. When his younger brother, John arrives to close the deal, he also is attracted to Sarah, and after a whirlwind courtship, marries her.

When living a lonely existence in John's grand house in Manchester, England, Sarah confides to Richard that she is depressed by her marriage. Richard encourages her to divorce John and run off with him. Sarah consults a lawyer, but finally ignores Richard's advice, and somehow reconciles with her husband. Seeking revenge, Richard then poisons his brother and attempts to frame Sarah for the murder.

Dr. White is suspicious of the circumstances behind John’s rapid decline, and after his death, Sarah’s purchase of arsenic casts suspicion on her. In standing trial for murder, Richard defends Sarah thinking he will win her love, but she is found guilty. Another suitor, Jerome Thorn, is convinced he knows the identity of the poisoner, and comes to Sarah's aid.

Cast

Critical reception
In reviewing The Mark of Cain, Britmovie wrote, "... the story never catches fire, one reason for this is the heavy-handed direction of Brian Desmond Hurst which fails to maintain adequate suspense. Dermot Walsh and Patrick Holt overplay their roles and both were a promise never really to be fulfilled, but Eric Portman dominates the film in a barnstorming acting performance. Sally Gray is somewhat inconsequential and there’s no spark of chemistry between the leads."

Film critic Allan Essler Smith wrote, "This powerful drama is an interesting example of a strand of late 1940s British cinema, but has been long neglected and not shown on British TV for many years, if at all. Set in the late Victorian and early Edwardian eras, it has excellent period detail and the sets effectively highlight Sarah's alienation and despair in the Howards's suffocating and gloomy household."

References

Notes

Bibliography

 Murphy, Robert. Realism and Tinsel: Cinema and Society in Britain 1939-48. London: Routledge, 2003. ISBN

External links
 

1947 films
1940s historical drama films
1940s English-language films
British historical drama films
Films directed by Brian Desmond Hurst
Two Cities Films films
Films based on British novels
British black-and-white films
Films set in the 1890s
Films set in France
Films set in Yorkshire
British courtroom films
Films shot at Denham Film Studios
1947 drama films
1940s British films